Ronald Frederick Delport (born 18 November 1931) is a former cricketer who played first-class cricket for Western Province in South Africa from 1950 to 1964.

An off-spinner, Ronnie Delport made his first-class debut for Western Province at the age of 19 in December 1950 against Rhodesia in the Currie Cup. He took 7 for 54 on the first day, and Western Province won by six wickets. In his next match a few days later he took 5 for 87 in Transvaal's second innings. The rest of his career was less spectacular, and in all he played only 14 first-class matches spread over 14 seasons.

References

External links

1931 births
Living people
Cricketers from Cape Town
South African cricketers
Western Province cricketers